Portuguese Angolan is a person of Portuguese descent born or permanently living in Angola. The number of Portuguese Angolans dropped during the Angolan War of Independence, but several hundreds of thousands have again returned to live and work in Angola in the 21st century.

History

In 1482, Portuguese caravels commanded by Diogo Cão arrived in the Kingdom of Kongo. Other expeditions followed, and close relations were soon established between the two states. The Portuguese brought firearms and many other technological advances, as well as a new religion (Christianity); in return, the King of the Congo offered plenty of slaves, ivory, and minerals.

The Portuguese colony of Angola was founded in 1575 with the arrival of Paulo Dias de Novais with a hundred families of colonists and four hundred soldiers. Luanda was granted the status of city in 1605. Many Portuguese settlers married native Africans resulting in a mixed-race (mulato, later generally called mestiço) population. Angola was declared a formal Portuguese province in the 19th century, but only in the early 20th century did the mainland government allow large-scale white emigration and settlement to Angola and its other provinces.

In 1960, Angola had up to 172,000 Portuguese settlers, who significantly contributed to its economy. The majority of whom came from rural agrarian backgrounds in Portugal who saw engaging in commerce in Angola as one of the few means of upward social mobility available to them.

As the Angolan war of independence began in 1961, triggering off a late colonial development of Angola, there was an influx of Portuguese military personnel, as well as civil servants and other people. As a consequence, the number of Portuguese living in Angola went up to about 350,000. This number would have been higher, had a significant part of the settlers not left for other countries, especially Namibia, Brazil, South Africa and the United States. While most Portuguese then living in Angola sided with Portugal's efforts to suppress the anti-colonial revolt, a minority sympathized with the nationalist movements, and a few even joined them in their fight. The Angolan author Pepetela is among these. When the Salazar regime in Portugal was abolished by a military coup in Portugal, in 1974, and independence was granted to the colonies by the new government, whites overwhelmingly left Angola after independence in 1975. Most of them went to Portugal, where they were called retornados and were not always welcomed, while others moved to neighboring Namibia (then a South African territory), South Africa or Brazil, or United States.  It is estimated that around 250,000 left the country in 1975 and by 1976 only 30,000 to 40,000 remained in Angola.

Among the departed Portuguese civilians, many were able to take with them only a single suitcase, while some were able to dispatch their household goods and even cars by ship. The majority left everything behind. They boarded planes at Luanda's Craveiro Lopes Airport at the rate of 500 a day, but there were not enough flights to cover demand. On arrival in Portugal, those who had been able to draw their savings in Angola could not exchange more than 5,000 Angolan escudos (about USD 200) into Portuguese escudos. Back in Angola, the new government gave all remaining Portuguese settlers a few months period to choose between Angolan citizenship or to leave the country. A significant minority of them opted for Angola and some of them actively took part in the Angolan Civil War, generally on the side of the MPLA.

After Angola abandoned in 1991 the socialist regime adopted at independence in 1975, many Portuguese Angolans returned to Angola. Due to Angola's economic boom, which started in the 1990s, an increasing number of Portuguese without previous attachment to Angola have migrated to Angola for economic reasons, most importantly the recent national economic boom. As of 2008, Angola was the preferred destination for Portuguese migrants in Africa. Portuguese nationals numbered an estimated 120,000 in 2011, reaching about 200,000 in 2013.

Notable people

Notable Angolan people of Portuguese descent include:
 António Jacinto, poet and politician, Minister of Culture
 Pepetela, writer, politician
 Lúcio Lara, General Secretary of the MPLA
 José Maria Pimentel, writer and illustrator
 Hélder Costa
 Paulo Figueiredo, footballer
 Rony Lopes
 Rúben Gouveia, footballer
 José Águas, footballer
 José Luís Vidigal, footballer
 Wilson Constantino Novo Estrela, footballer
 Pedro Lima, actor and olympic swimmer
 Ricardo Teixeira, racing driver
 José Eduardo Agualusa, journalist and writer
 Luandino Vieira, writer
 João Teixeira Pinto, Portuguese military officer 
 Ana Paula Ribeiro Tavares writer, historian
 Tomaz Morais, rugby union coach
 Xesko, artist, writer, swimmer
 Ernesto Lara Filho, revolutionary writer and agronomist
 Iko Carreira, Defense Minister of Angola
 Alda Lara, poet
 Luaty Beirão, rapper and activist
 Victorino Cunha, basketball coach
 Amélia Veiga, poet and teacher
 Ruy Duarte de Carvalho, author and filmmaker
 Luís Magalhães, basketball coach
 Mário Palma, basketball coach
 Armando Gama, singer-songwriter
 Ana Sofia Nóbrega, swimmer
 Nádia Cruz, swimmer
 Elsa Freire, swimmer
 João Paulo de Silva, sport shooter
 André Matias, rower
 Salvador Gordo, swimmer

Language and religion

Their native language is Portuguese, which today is the official language and lingua franca of Angola. Their communities existing in Luanda, Benguela and Moçâmedes spoke until the early 20th-century Portuguese mixed with numerous elements from African languages, especially Kimbundu and Umbundu. In the course of the 20th century, due to the waves of new settlers arriving from Portugal, their language became practically identical with European Portuguese. Some Portuguese Angolans have a lesser or greater mastery of one of the  Bantu languages – notably Kimbundu, Umbundu, and Kikongo – but their number has diminished dramatically after independence, and hardly anybody now uses an African language as second languages. The vast majority of Portuguese Angolans are Christians, mostly Roman Catholics, although many of them do not practice their religion. A very small number of them are Jews, whose ancestors escaped the Inquisition.

See also
White Angolans
Lusotropicalismo
Luso-Africans
Assimilados
Lançados
Angolan mestiços
Órfãs do Rei
Angolar language
Angolanidade
Angolans in Portugal
Retornados

References

External links
Flight from Angola, The Economist, August 16, 1975

 
Ethnic groups in Angola
Angola